Palanda Canton is a canton of Ecuador, located in the Zamora-Chinchipe Province. Its population at the 2001 census was 7,066.

History
This canton has a long history, from the earliest known humans occupation to one of the latest inca battle, just before the colonial time.

Parishes 
The canton is administratively divided into 4 parishes
 Vergel
 Palanda
 El Porvenir
 Valladolid

Archaeology
The site of Santa Ana (La Florida) is located just to the north of Palanda. This is an important archaeological site going back as early as 3,500 BC. 

The work in this area was started in 2002 by a team of French and Ecuadoran archaeologists.

References

natureandculture.org

Bibliography
Human settlements already existed in the Amazon Basin (Ecuador) 4000 years ago. 12-May-2004 eurekalert.org
Valdez, Francisco. “Inter-zonal relationships in Ecuador”, en Handbook of South American Archaeology, Helaine Silverman y William Isbell eds., Springer, pp. 865–891, 2008
Valdez, Francisco; Jean Gufroy; Geoffroy de Saulieu; Julio Hurtado; Alexandra Yépez (2005), Découverte d’un site cérémoniel formatif sur le versant oriental des Andes Proyecto Zamora Chinchipe

Cantons of Zamora-Chinchipe Province